GuideML (Guide Markup Language) is a document markup language.

GuideML is an application of XML standards. It mostly consists of a safe subset of XHTML with some extra tags for specific features of the software. The aim is to provide something which resembles HTML but is simpler to learn, and allows basically textual content to be formatted in a skinnable way. Early versions of the h2g2 software offered full HTML markup as an option, but this was removed for security reasons; thus only parts of HTML which are considered to exist in GuideML can now be used, with things such as JavaScript and externally hosted images being removed by the parser.

See also
List of document markup languages
Comparison of document markup languages

Markup languages
XML-based standards